Juana Enriquez, 5th Lady of Casarrubios del Monte (1425 – 13 February 1468) was Queen of Aragon and de facto Queen consort of Navarre as the wife of King John II. Juana Enríquez was the Regent of Navarre during the absence of her husband in the Navarrese Civil War (1451–1455); she also served as Governor of Catalonia in 1462 in the place of her son (who was his father's nominal governor) and, finally, as Regent of Aragon during the absence of her husband in the Catalan Civil War between 1465 and 1468.

Biography

Juana Enriquez was a daughter of Fadrique Enríquez and Mariana Fernández de Córdoba, 4th Lady of Casarrubios del Monte, and succeeded her mother in 1431. Born in Torrelobatón, she was a great-great-granddaughter of Alfonso XI of Castile.

Queen of Navarre
The marriage between Juana Enriquez and John of Aragon was arranged because John wished to ally himself with the powerful noble faction she belonged to, a faction which had major power in Castile at the time. They were engaged in 1443, but the marriage was delayed. The wedding finally took place in 1447.

Juana married John after the death of his first wife, Queen Blanche I of Navarre. Although John ceased to be de jure uxoris monarch of Navarre on his wife's death, he never ceded power to his son, Charles, Prince of Viana, and daughter, de jure Blanche II of Navarre, a decision which Juana supported.  Such breaking of the law of succession led to a confrontation with the Crown of Aragon and a conflict between farmers and nobles, the outbreak of Navarrese Civil War. When Johan served in the war, he appointed Juana Enríquez to act as his Regent. She left Navarre to give birth in 1452. Her husband was forced to leave Navarre in 1455, and her stepson Charles of Viana was installed as regent in Navarre with Castilian support.

Queen of Aragon
In 1458, her husband became king of Aragon. In 1460, her father in Castile provided her with documentation that Charles of Viana was planning to murder his father. Juana showed the document to her husband, who used it in order to have his son arrested and imprisoned accused of treason. The Catalonians protested against the arrest of Charles of Viana. The king appointed his wife to negotiate with the Catalonians. In June 1461 she made a treaty with Catalonia in which Charles of Viana was appointed his fathers governor in Catalonia. Shortly thereafter however, Charles of Viana died. John II proclaimed his son with Juana, Ferdinand, as heir of Aragon. He gave Juana the task to have their son accepted as heir and governor of Catalonia.

On 6 February 1462, Juana Enríquez had her son hailed as the heir of Catalonia and his fathers governor of Catalonia. Since her son was a minor, she swore his oath to the Catalonians in his place, and acted as Governor of Catalonia in his place. Accused of having ordered the poisoning of Charles of Viana, Juana fled to Girona, seeking the protection of the bishop. They were besieged in Girona until July 1462. Juana Enríquez was appointed regent of Aragon in March 1465, when her husband was absent in Catalonia, trying to suppress the rebellion.

Legacy

Queen Juana's greatest wish was to have her son, Ferdinand, married to Isabella, half-sister and heir presumptive of King Henry IV of Castile. Their marriage, which did occur, lasted for 35 years and produced a prince and four queens. However, Juana died on 13 February 1468 from breast cancer, a year before the marriage occurred. Her husband never remarried and reigned until his death in 1479. Her daughter Joanna married Ferdinand I of Naples and thus became Queen of Naples.

References

External links

1425 births
1468 deaths
Juana
15th-century Aragonese nobility
15th-century nobility from the Kingdom of Navarre
Aragonese queen consorts
Countesses of Barcelona
Majorcan queens consort
Navarrese royal consorts
Royal consorts of Sicily
Deaths from breast cancer
Deaths from cancer in Spain
Burials at the Poblet Monastery
15th-century Spanish women
15th-century women rulers